Alexandru Gheorghe Plagino (November 16, 1876 – May 3, 1949) was a Romanian sports shooter who competed in the 1900 Summer Olympics. He was born in Dumbrăveni, Vrancea County, and died in Bucharest.

In 1900 he participated in the trap shooting event and finished thirteenth. He was the first ever Olympic competitor for Romania.

References

External links
 

1876 births
1949 deaths
Romanian male sport shooters
Shooters at the 1900 Summer Olympics
Olympic shooters of Romania
People from Vrancea County